Nostis et nobiscum is an encyclical given by Pope Pius IX on December 8, 1849 on the topic of the Church in the Papal States.

In this document, the Pope denounces socialism and communism for attempting to confuse the faithful with new doctrines. He speaks of plots and conspiracies created by revolutionaries and rationalists in order to overthrow the temporal power of the Catholic Church. He deplores the problem of indifferentism in matters of religion and urges Italians to obey their legitimate political authorities. He adds that Christianity protects true liberty and equality, and that such revolutions are therefore useless.

See also
 List of encyclicals of Pope Pius IX

External links
Nostis et nobiscum

Documents of Pope Pius IX
Papal encyclicals
1849 documents
1849 in Christianity
Papal States
December 1849 events